Leyte (IPA: ['lɛɪte]), officially the Municipality of Leyte, is a 4th class municipality in the province of Leyte, Philippines. According to the 2020 census, it has a population of 40,397 people.

History 
There are several versions as to how the place got its name. One of these relates that according to tradition, toward the west of the present town of Carigara, was a village ruled by Datu Ete. When the Augustinian Fathers heard of the region, they went to the place in order to Christianize the natives. They sailed by boat towards a small bay that swelled into a big river. Disembarking at a small village near the bank of the river, the friars asked the natives for direction. The natives, not knowing the language, answered, "Hira Ete" - which means, "the place belonged to Ete." The friars thought the natives meant that the name of the place was called Hiraete, hence their communications with their superiors referred to the place as Hiraite.

Geography

Barangays
Leyte is politically subdivided into 30 barangays.

Climate

Demographics

Economy

References

External links
 Official website
 [ Philippine Standard Geographic Code]
Philippine Census Information
Local Governance Performance Management System

Municipalities of Leyte (province)